Little Braxted is a village and civil parish located near the town of Witham, in the Maldon district, in the county of Essex, England. The population of the civil parish at the 2011 Census was 170. According to the Census there were 84 males and 86 females living in the parish in 2011. Little Braxted has a small medieval church dedicated to St Nicholas, which was extensively decorated in the Victorian era.
Little Braxted has one pub, The Green Man.

Lawrence Washington was rector of St Nicholas's Church following his ejection from the somewhat better endowed All Saints Purleigh also in Essex.

In the 1870s Little Braxted was described as having:Acres, 563. Real property, £1,173. Pop., 111. Houses, 23. The property is divided among a few. The living is a rectory in the diocese of Rochester Value, £118. Patrons, Trustees of Sir W. B. Rush. The church is good.

References

External links 
 Little Braxted: Listed Buildings in Essex

Villages in Essex
Civil parishes in Essex
Maldon District